Khanon i (also spelt khanon e) is a traditional Burmese snack or mont. The word khanon comes from Thai khanom (lit. 'dessert'). The snack is essentially a patty of steamed glutinous rice and peanut oil, garnished with coconut shavings. 

Khanon i originates in Upper Myanmar, where it is considered a royal delicacy, along with khanon htok. A series of Burmese–Siamese wars beginning with Hsinbyushin's reign resulted in the emergence of Thai-inspired delicacies, including khanon htok, shwe yin aye, and mont let hsaung.

References

Burmese cuisine
Rice cakes